Walter Richmond Herrick (May 11, 1877 in Albany, New York – July 20, 1953) was an American lawyer and politician from New York.

Education and career
He was the son of Assemblyman Jonathan R. Herrick (1818–1890) and his second wife Charlotte Jackson (Brown) Herrick (1847–1918). He graduated from Princeton University in 1898, and from Albany Law School in 1900.

He was a member of the New York State Assembly (New York Co., 27th D.) in 1911; and of the New York State Senate (17th D.) in 1913 and 1914.

In 1919, he was appointed by Gov. Al Smith as Narcotic Drug Control Commissioner, holding that office for three years.

He was appointed Manhattan Park Commissioner by Mayor James J. Walker, remaining in that position from 1927 to 1933.

Judge D-Cady Herrick (1846–1926) was his half-brother.

Personal life and death
On July 5, 1916, Herrick married Mary Douglas Bosworth, and they had a daughter: Eileen J. Herrick (born 1919). In 1939, Herrick made the news when he and his wife allegedly prevented Eileen, then an adult, from seeing George Lowther III, a suitor with whom she was enamored, leading Lowther to take the parents to court seeking a writ of habeas corpus. The young couple eloped early the following year, but divorced in 1946.

Herrick died in Albany at the age of 76.

References

Sources
 Official New York from Cleveland to Hughes by Charles Elliott Fitch (Hurd Publishing Co., New York and Buffalo, 1911, Vol. IV; pg. 360)
 LEGISLATORS DODGE CHOICE FOR SENATOR in NYT on January 13, 1911
 The Princeton Alumni Weekly (issue of April 23, 1919; pg. 579)
 HERRICK RESIGNS; SHEEHY GETS POST in NYT on April 6, 1933 (subscription required)
 Miss E. J. Herrick To Head Juniors At Ice Review in the New York Sun on January 17, 1938

External links
 New York City park commissioners

1877 births
Democratic Party New York (state) state senators
People from Manhattan
Democratic Party members of the New York State Assembly
Princeton University alumni
Politicians from Albany, New York
Albany Law School alumni
Lawyers from Albany, New York
1953 deaths